Mangelia hooveri is an extinct species of sea snail, a marine gastropod mollusk in the family Mangeliidae.

Description
The length of the shell attains 10.9 mm, its diameter 3 mm.

(Original description) The small, solid shell has an elongate-fusiform shape. The spire is elevated with a mammilliform apex. It contains six whorls, only slightly convex, with about ten low, rounded, slightly oblique, transverse ridges. The first whorl is smooth, while the next three are more convex than the lower ones, and have traces of spiral sculpture. The sculpture of the  body whorl  is nearly obsolete. The aperture is elliptical, tapering to a very short siphonal canal anteriorly. The outer lip is arcuate and thin. The columella is quite long and straight. .

Distribution
This extinct marine species was found off San Pedro, California, USA.

References

External links
 Worldwide Mollusc Species Data Base : Mangelia hooveri
 ITIS: Mangelia hooveri

hooveri
Gastropods described in 1903